The Rabindra Sarobar Stadium is a multi-use stadium in Lake Gardens, Kolkata, India. It is used for football matches and it serves as the home of many Calcutta Football League matches.

History
The venue opened in 1961. It also was the home ground of Indian Super League club ATK in 2016 while the Salt Lake Stadium was undergoing renovations for the 2017 FIFA U-17 World Cup.

For the 2016–17 I-League season it has hosted a majority of the home matches for Mohun Bagan. Mohun Bagan used the venue as their home stadium for the AFC Cup matches in 2017. It also hosted some important domestic and international level matches. It also hosts Rugby Union matches.

References

Football venues in West Bengal
Sports venues in Kolkata
Football in Kolkata
1961 establishments in West Bengal
Sports venues completed in 1961
Tollygunge Agragami FC
20th-century architecture in India